Cassie Fliegel (born 1984) is an American actress and screenwriter. She is the granddaughter of basketball player Bernie Fliegel, as well as the sister of entrepreneur Jordan Fliegel.

Education
Fliegel attended high school at Cambridge Rindge and Latin School in Cambridge, Massachusetts and pursued a higher education at Harvard University. At Harvard, she majored in English studies and acted in several plays at the American Repertory Theater.

Selected filmography

Television
 L.A. Forensics (2007)
 Greek (2007)
 The Office (2008)
 Raising the Bar (2009)
 Nip/Tuck (2009)

Film
 Don't Look in the Cellar (2008)
 The 41-Year-Old Virgin Who Knocked Up Sarah Marshall and Felt Superbad About It (2010)
 Kissing Strangers (2010)
 The Tommyknockerz (2011 short)
 Aliens vs. Avatars (2011)
 Night of the Dead (2012)

References

External links
 

1984 births
Living people
Harvard College alumni
21st-century American actresses
Actresses from Cambridge, Massachusetts
American television actresses
Screenwriters from Massachusetts
Date of birth missing (living people)
Cambridge Rindge and Latin School alumni